Borboropsis puberula is a species of fly in the family Heleomyzidae. It is found in Europe.

References

Heleomyzidae
Articles created by Qbugbot
Insects described in 1838
Taxa named by Johan Wilhelm Zetterstedt